Cochlodinium is a genus of dinoflagellates belonging to the family Gymnodiniaceae.

Species:

Cochlodinium achromaticum 
Cochlodinium acutum 
Cochlodinium adriaticum 
Cochlodinium polykrikoides

References

Gymnodiniales
Dinoflagellate genera